The 1995 1. divisjon, the highest women's football (soccer) league in Norway, began on 22 April 1995 and ended on 14 October 1995.

18 games were played with 3 points given for wins and 1 for draws. Number nine and ten were relegated, while two teams from the 2. divisjon were promoted through a playoff round. For the next season, the league was renamed Eliteserien.

Trondheims-Ørn won the league, losing only one game.

League table

Top goalscorers
 31 goals:
  Randi Leinan, Trondheims-Ørn
 23 goals:
  Ann Kristin Aarønes, Trondheims-Ørn
 17 goals:
  Åse Iren Steine, Sandviken
 16 goals:
  Hege Riise, Setskog/Høland
 11 goals:
  Kjersti Thun, Asker
 10 goals:
  Kariann Røgenes, Klepp
  Lene Inngjerdingen, Setskog/Høland
 9 goals:
  Hilde Dvergsdal, Asker
  Heidi Eivik, Grand Bodø

Promotion and relegation
 Donn and Grand Bodø were relegated to the 2. divisjon.
 Bøler and Gjelleråsen were promoted from the 2. divisjon through play-offs.

References

League table
Fixtures
Goalscorers

Norwegian First Division (women) seasons
Top level Norwegian women's football league seasons
1
Nor
Nor